The Nindooinbah Dam is a decommissioned earth-fill embankment dam with an un-gated spillway located off-stream in the South East region of Queensland, Australia. The sole purpose of the dam is for recreation.

Location and features

Non-powered boating is permitted on Nindooinbah Dam and public access is available to the dam wall embankment area.

See also

List of dams in Queensland

References

Scenic Rim Region
Dams in Queensland
Embankment dams
Earth-filled dams
Dams completed in 1951
Buildings and structures in South East Queensland
1951 establishments in Australia